Alexander Woo is an American writer and producer for television.

Biography

Screenwriting
Alexander Woo is best known for writing several episodes of the HBO drama series True Blood.  In an interview, Woo describes the "True Blood" writing room: "Every writer's room is different. True Blood has a relatively small writing team, so the chemistry between the writers is crucial to the style and tone of the show. It's kind of like being on a jury, where you are sequestered together for long hours and many days and you figure things out together. Our team is a wonderful group of people, and even though the hours are long we all work really well and the hours just fly by."

Among Woo's credits for the show was a first-season episode that was notable for the "AIDS burger" monologue made famous by actor Nelsan Ellis. "In the hands and the mouth of Nelsan, he made that piece of dialogue sing," Woo told NPR  after Ellis' death.

He has also written episodes of Manhattan, Sleeper Cell, LAX, and Wonderfalls, and co-wrote HBO's adaptation of The Immortal Life of Henrietta Lacks. He was developing a series about Civil Rights in Birmingham, Alabama with AMC. He is also the showrunner and co-creator of the second season  of AMC's anthology series, The Terror.

Education
Woo studied creative writing at Princeton University.  He subsequently attended the Yale School of Drama where he earned an MFA in playwriting.

Awards and nominations
Nominations
 2009 Writers Guild of America Award for Best New Series – True Blood
 2010 PGA Award for Television Producer of the Year Award in Episodic – True Blood
 2010 Image Award for Outstanding Writing in a Dramatic Series – True Blood

References

External links 
 

Living people
American male screenwriters
Princeton University alumni
Yale School of Drama alumni
American television writers
American male television writers
Year of birth missing (living people)